Håkon Haugli (born 21 May 1969) is a Norwegian politician and business executive. Since 2019 he is the CEO of Innovation Norway.

Personal life
Haugli was born in Oslo on 21 May 1969.

Career
A deputy member of the Storting from 2009 to 2013, Haugli represented the Labour Party and the Oslo District, and replaced prime minister Jens Stoltenberg as representative during this period. His prior work experience includes Gjensidige (insurance) and McKinsey & Co. He has held a number of board positions and holds a law degree from the University of Oslo. From 2014 to 2019 he was the Managing Director of Abelia, the business association for Norwegian knowledge and technology based enterprises. The association is part of the Confederation of Norwegian Enterprise (NHO). 

In 2019, Haugli was appointed the CEO of Innovation Norway, a governmental instrument for innovation and development of Norwegian enterprises and industry.

References

1969 births
Living people
Civil servants from Oslo
Politicians from Oslo
Gay politicians
Gay businessmen
Norwegian gay men
Labour Party (Norway) politicians
Norwegian LGBT politicians
21st-century Norwegian politicians
LGBT legislators
Norwegian LGBT businesspeople